Bengal Military Police was the title of two different units at different times:
The Bengal Military Police, 1856–63, subsequently 45th Rattray's Sikhs
The Bengal Military Police, 1891–1920, subsequently Eastern Frontier Rifles